David Lee (born 28 March 1980) is an English professional footballer who plays as a midfielder. He is currently without a club, having last played for Canvey Island.

Career
Born in Basildon, Lee has played with Tottenham Hotspur, Southend United, Hull City (where he scored once against York City), Brighton & Hove Albion, Bristol Rovers, Thurrock, Oldham Athletic, Stevenage Borough, Aldershot Town and Canvey Island.

References

External links

Post War English & Scottish Football League A - Z Player's Transfer Database
Non League Daily

1980 births
Living people
English footballers
Tottenham Hotspur F.C. players
Southend United F.C. players
Hull City A.F.C. players
Brighton & Hove Albion F.C. players
Bristol Rovers F.C. players
Thurrock F.C. players
Oldham Athletic A.F.C. players
Stevenage F.C. players
Aldershot Town F.C. players
Canvey Island F.C. players
English Football League players
National League (English football) players
Association football agents
British sports agents
Sportspeople from Basildon
Association football midfielders